Orizari is a village in the municipality of Lipkovo, North Macedonia.

Demographics
As of the 2021 census, Orizari had 1,692 residents with the following ethnic composition:
Albanians 1,666
Persons for whom data are taken from administrative sources 26

According to the 2002 census, the village had a total of 2,094 inhabitants. Ethnic groups in the village include:

Albanians 2064
Macedonians 3
Others 27

Notable People 
Ismet Jashari

References

External links

Villages in Lipkovo Municipality
Albanian communities in North Macedonia